Owain James Warlow (born 25 October 1987) is a Welsh footballer who plays as a defender and midfielder for Penybont. He is also a former Wales under-21 international.

He has previously played for Lincoln City, Kettering Town, Llanelli and Gainsborough Trinity.

Club career

Lincoln City
Born in Church Village, near Pontypridd, Warlow is a product of Lincoln City's Center of Excellence youth academy. He made his professional debut on 10 February 2007 in a 2–0 win over Torquay United, going on to make a total of 5 appearances for the side in his first season and being handed a two-year contract. After featuring in the first team squad more during the 2007–08 season, he joined Conference National side Kettering Town on loan at the start of the 2008–09 season, making four appearances before returning to Lincoln.

Llanelli
However Warlow did not feature for the club during the remainder of the season and was released in May 2009, along with six other players. On 16 June 2009, it was announced that Warlow had signed for Welsh Premier League side Llanelli on a free transfer, after spending time training with the side. He made his debut as a 51st-minute substitute in place of player-manager Andy Legg during Llanelli's Europa League victory over Motherwell.

He departed the club, by mutual consent, in March 2011 to move to Barcelona.

Gainsborough Trinity
On 23 July 2011 Warlow played for Gainsborough Trinity on trial in a friendly match against Frickley Athletic, before signing for the club on 9 August 2011.

Worksop Town
Following a successful loan spell, Warlow signed for Northern Premier League Premier Division team, Worksop Town, on 9 December 2011.

Following a rough start to his Worksop career playing at left back, he was soon moved further forward into a left wing position, where he has enjoyed a great deal of success. The highlight of his Worksop career coming in the game against Frickley Athletic, where he rounded off a superb display by scoring the equalising goal in a game Worksop went on to win 2–1.

In August 2014 he joined Merthyr Tydfil and a year later Tamworth. Following being unable to commit, Warlow retired from football in November, 2015. In 2016, Warlow returnes to football with Penybont.

International career
In early 2007, Warlow was called up to the Welsh Under-21 side, playing 90 minutes in a 4–0 win over Northern Ireland Under-21s. He made his second appearance for the side on 21 August 2007 as a substitute for Joe Allen during a 4–3 win over Sweden Under-21s.

In September 2009, Warlow was called to join the Wales Under-23 Semi Professionals for their friendly against Poland in Carmarthen, Wales.

Personal life
As a child, he attended Ysgol Gyfun Rhydfelen, a Welsh language secondary school.

Career statistics

References

External links

Owain Warlow Profile at The Forgotten Imp
Lincoln City profile

1987 births
Living people
Footballers from Pontypridd
Welsh footballers
Wales under-21 international footballers
Lincoln City F.C. players
Kettering Town F.C. players
Llanelli Town A.F.C. players
Gainsborough Trinity F.C. players
Worksop Town F.C. players
Merthyr Tydfil F.C. players
Tamworth F.C. players
English Football League players
Penybont F.C. players
National League (English football) players
Cymru Premier players
People educated at Ysgol Gyfun Garth Olwg
Association football midfielders